The bartail flathead (Platycephalus indicus), also known as the Indian flathead, gobi or Indo-Pacific flathead, is a species of largely marine ray-finned fish belonging to the family Platycephalidae, the flatheads. This species is found in the Indian Ocean and the Western Pacific Ocean, and has invaded the eastern Mediterranean Sea.

Taxonomy
The bartail flathead was first formally described in 1758 as Callionymus indicus by Carl Linnaeus in the 10th edition of Systema Naturae with the type locality given as “Asia”. In 1795 the German physician and naturalist Marcus Elieser Bloch described Platycephalus spathula from Tranquebar in India creating the genus Platycephalus. In 1917 David Starr Jordan and Barton Warren Evermann designated Bloch’s P. spathula as the type species of Platycephalus, P. spathula is now considered to be a junior synonym of Linnaeus’s C. Indicus.

Species complex
There are indications that Platycephalus indicus sensu lato is a species complex, the Australian bartail flathead (P. australis) has been recognised as a valid species, and there is evidence that some of the records of this species from the waters of Japan and China are of two undescribed species, although a 2017 study confirmed the presence of P. indicus in this region.

Etymology
The specific name indicus likely refers to the Indian Ocean.

Description
The bartail flathead has a depressed head that is smooth, apart from low parieto-occipital, scapular and preopercular ridges, which are neither spined nor serrated. There is a short, blunt spine in front of the eye. The preoperculum terminates in 2 strong, slightly upturned spines. There are canine like vomerine teeth, with a single obvious row of canine-like teeth on the palatine while the jaws have wide bands of villiform teeth. The first dorsal fin has a short separate first spine and a further 7-9 spines, the second dorsal fin has 13 soft rays, as does the anal fin.. The rear margins of the second dorsal fin and anal fin have deep incisions in the membrane between the rays. The overall colour is brownish, there are 8 or 9 indistinct dusky bands across the back. The top of the head is finely mottled with more or less roundish spots each enclosed in a pale ring> the lower body is yellowish. the fins, other than the caudal fin, have rows of dusky spots on the fin rays while the caudal fin has a longitudinal black band in its middle, with 2 diagonal black bands above and below this.

Distribution and habitat
The bartail flathead has a wide Indo-Pacific distribution from the Red Sea and the eastern coast of Africa east to the Philippines, north to Japan and south to Papua New Guinea. It was previously thought to occur in northern Australia but this population has now been recognised as a separate species P. australis. It is recorded on occasions in the Levantine waters of the Mediterranean Sea since 1953, a likely entry from the Suez Canal.  

Biology
The bartail flat head is an ambush predator feeding on fishes and crustaceans.

Fisheries
It is considered to be a good food fish and the flesh is sold fresh. It is also an ingredient in Chinese traditional medicine.

References

bartail flathead
Fish of Bangladesh
Fish of the Indian Ocean
Fish of Indonesia
bartail flathead
Taxa named by Carl Linnaeus